

Hans Teusen (26 July 1917 – 11 February 2011) was a German paratroop officer during World War II. He was a recipient of the Knight's Cross of the Iron Cross of Nazi Germany.  After the war he joined the Bundeswehr of West Germany and achieved a general's rank.

Awards and decorations
 Iron Cross (1939) 2nd Class (15 May 1940) & 1st Class (28 May 1940)
 Knight's Cross of the Iron Cross on 14 June 1941 as Leutnant and Zugführer (platoon leader) in the 6./Fallschirmjäger-Regiment 2
 German Cross in Gold on 10 September 1944 as Hauptmann in the I./Fallschirmjäger-Regiment 16
 Officer Cross of the Order of Merit of the Federal Republic of Germany 1970
 Commander Cross of the Order of Merit of the Federal Republic of Germany 1977

References

Citations

Bibliography

 
 
 

1917 births
2011 deaths
People from Westerwaldkreis
Bundeswehr generals
Fallschirmjäger of World War II
Commanders Crosses of the Order of Merit of the Federal Republic of Germany
Recipients of the Gold German Cross
Recipients of the Knight's Cross of the Iron Cross
People from the Rhine Province
Major generals of the German Army
Military personnel from Rhineland-Palatinate